This is a list of radio stations that broadcast on FM frequency 97.4 MHz:

Australia
 3WRB in Melbourne, Victoria

China
 Beijing Yinyue Tai in Beijing
 CNR The Voice of China in Jining

Ireland
 98FM in north County Dublin

Malaysia
 TraXX FM in Malacca and Northern Johor

Portugal
 :pt:Rádio Comercial in Lisbon

United Kingdom
 Cool FM in Northern Ireland
 in Oxford

References

Lists of radio stations by frequency